Randy Cunningham: 9th Grade Ninja is an animated television series created by Jed Elinoff and Scott Thomas for Disney XD. It was produced by Titmouse, Inc. and Boulder Media Limited for Disney's London-based content hub. Many of the character designs were supplied by Jhonen Vasquez, the creator of Invader Zim. The first episode premiered on Disney XD on August 13, 2012, and the final episode premiered on July 27, 2015. Voice direction for the series was done by Ginny McSwain. Shaun Cashman was the supervising director.

Plot
A town called Norrisville has been protected by a ninja for 800 years, but what the citizens of Norrisville do not know is that a new ninja is selected every four years. Randy Cunningham, the ninth grade teenager, is the next ninja. Now, Randy must protect Norrisville from the evil plans of the Sorcerer, his ally Hannibal McFist, and Hannibal's assistant Willem Viceroy.

Characters

Main characters
 Randall "Randy" Cunningham / Ninja (voiced by Ben Schwartz) - A Norrisville High freshman who was chosen to be the "Ninja", a mystic warrior who protects the school and the city from any danger that threatens the safety of people. Randy is a young student who faces monsters and freaks to keep the evil Sorcerer in his arrest. 
 Howard Weinerman (voiced by Andrew Caldwell) - Howard is Randy's best friend and the only one who knows his secret identity as the Ninja.

Villains
 The Sorcerer (voiced by Tim Curry in season one, Ben Cross in season two) - An 800-year-old master of the dark arts who is determined to destroy his nemesis, the Ninja. At the beginning of the 13th century, the Sorcerer was imprisoned in a hole that is now located beneath the school. The Sorcerer's main weapon is "stank", a magical ability that one uses to temporarily turn people into monsters.
 Hannibal McFist (voiced by John DiMaggio) - The owner and CEO of McFist Industries and one of the Ninja's enemies. McFist also has a mechanical arm with a brain that replaces his right arm. While everyone in Norrisville views him as a benevolent businessman, he has secretly made a deal to help the Sorcerer destroy the Ninja in exchange for the power of McFist's choosing. When Stankified by the Sorcerer, he becomes a large blue crab-like monster with long hair and his brain becomes a sentient red claw.
 Willem Viceroy III (voiced by Kevin Michael Richardson) - Viceroy is a scientist that works at McFist Industries and is responsible for all robots that attack the Ninja.
 Psycho-Bot (voiced by Kevin Michael Richardson) - A robotic scorpion created by Viceroy programmed to copy the moves of the ninja and emotions. 
 Robo-Apes (voiced by John DiMaggio) - Robotic gorillas created by Viceroy that are often unleashed by Hannibal McFist to attack the Ninja.
Krackenstein (voiced by Fred Tatasciore) - A frankenstein robot with 6 Arms who tries to destroy the ninja which is the first robot to be shown in the series. It would later appear in season 2.
Punkbots (voiced by Billy Idol in season 1 and Robin Atkin Downes in season 2) - Are 3 robots created by Viceroy to rouse the McSatchlé Store as part of there latest plan to destroy the ninja. The Punkbot Leader and other 2 would later appear in season 2 as the ruler of Scrap City. 
Ninja-bot - A robot version of the ninja who has the same abilities as the ninja.
Steve Riley - A robot created by Viceroy in disguise as one of Flackville High School's chess players. He was programmed with every chess move ever played and single handedly defeated the whole Norrisville High Chess Team.
Franz Nukid  (voiced by Carlos Alazraqui)  - A robot created by Viceroy to infiltrate the school to find out the Ninja's identity. 
Slaying Mantis - A robotic mantis who is sent by Viceroy to attack the ninja while during vacation.
Rhinosaurus - A robotic rhino who can release gas and summons anyone's worst nightmare.
Robo-Elves - A robotic elf who serves as security guards in the Christmas Party of McFist. 
Robo-Snowman - A robotic snowman who is used to destroy the binja in the Christmas Party.
Robo-Frog - A robotic frog who is one the inventions to destroy the ninja in various battles.
Robo-Spiders - A robotic spider who is one the inventions to destroy the ninja. 
Robo-Snakes - A robotic snake who is one the inventions to destroy the ninja. 
Robo-Lizard - A robotic lizard who is trying find who is the ninja via sneezes and boogers. 
Robo-Cyclops - A robot created by Viceroy to destroy the ninja.
 Jerry Driscoll (voiced by Andy Dick) - Mrs. Driscoll's deceased mad scientist husband who spent his time building doomsday devices that could destroy the world and the universe when he was alive, and whose skeleton she now carries around with her at all times.
 The Disciplinarian (voiced by Andy Richter) - The tour guide for Detention Island. He really hates cheating so much that he'll go out of his way to try to kill anyone who commits this action if they are on his island.
 Mac Antfee (voiced by David Koechner) - He was the ninja of the 1980s but was "condemned for conduct unbecoming of a ninja" and stripped of the ninja suit.
 Man-Gong - Mac Antfee's right-hand man.
 Catfish Booray (voiced by Jim Cummings) - A psychotic Cajun swamp man who lives in the swamp behind the school.
 The Sorceress (voiced by Jennifer Tilly) - The Sorcerer's girlfriend. Like the Sorcerer, she can use the "stank" ability as well.
 Evil Julian (voiced by Dee Bradley Baker) - Evil Julian is an evil version of Julian who was created when Julian came in contact with one of the Sorcerer's Power Balls.
Brawn Brickwall (voiced by Matt Berry) -  A famous author, hunter, and adventurer from Norrisville.
Todd Principal/PAL (voiced by Paul Reubens) - A program created by the Norrisville high school board to ensure the kids to behave in class. 
Queen Gabnidine (voiced by Jon Lovitz) - The Queen of the Intraterrestrials from The Evil Mantle-Dwellers She has the odd verbal tic of ending nearly all her sentences with a long drawn-out, "Riiiiiiiiiiiiiiight?" She is just a made up person by Howard.
Whoopee 2 (voiced by Bill Hader) - An evil version of Whoopee who is built by Viceroy replacing the original. 
NomiRandy (voiced by Ben Schwartz in a Boston Accent) - An alternate Randy created by the Nomicon to teach him a lesson about Balance.
Halloweenja - Is the Ninja's suit infuse with power of "The Essence of Terror," who can turn anything to horrors.

Recurring characters
 Bucky Hensletter (voiced by Scott Menville) - A student of Norrisville High who is a member of the school's marching band, in which he plays the triangle. He always makes jokes or comebacks, followed up with a "Zing!". He is shown to be vulnerable enough to be turned into a purple fish-like monster with long eyes by the Sorcerer constantly.
 Bashford "Bash" Johnson (voiced by Dave Wittenberg) - A school bully who is also McFist's stepson, and the Norrisville High Crushin' Carp quarterback. When Stankified by the Sorcerer, he is transformed into a yellow monster with large arms.
 Heidi Weinerman (voiced by Cassie Scerbo) - Howard's older sister and the host of "Heidi@School!", an online gossip report that focuses on current events in the school and in the city. When Stankified by the Sorceress, she is transformed into a blue dog-like creature.
 Theresa Fowler (voiced by Sarah Hyland) - A Norrisville High student who is a member of the school's baton twirling team and also has a crush on Randy. When she is Stankified by the Sorcerer, she is transformed into a green plant-like monster.
 Debbie Kang (voiced by Piper Curda) - A straight-A student who has an obsession for Mexican death bears. When Debbie is Stankified by the Sorcerer, she is transformed into a porcupine-like monster.
 Irving Slimovitz (voiced by Jim Rash) - The principal of Norrisville High School. When he was stankified by the Sorcerer, Irving turns into a tiger-like creature.
 Marci McFist (voiced by April Stewart) - The wife of Hannibal McFist, sister-in-law of Terry McFist, and mother of Bashford Johnson.
 Doug (voiced by Scott Thomas) - A Norrisville High student. When Stankified by the Sorcerer, he becomes a carp-like monster.
 Flute Girl (voiced by Grey DeLisle) - Nerdy girl who plays the flute in the Norrisville High Marching Band. She has been stankified into three different forms: the first one was a two-headed one-legged monster (when combined with Stevens), the second was a Tyrannosaurus-like creature, and the third was when she was turned into a purple dog-like creature by the Sorceress.
 Rachel (voiced by Laura Marano) - The clarinet player in the Norrisville High Marching Band. When Stankified by the Sorcerer, Rachel is transformed into an enormous cat monster.
 Stevens - The trombone player in the school's marching band, he always wears sunglasses and hardly talks. When he was Stankified by the Sorcerer, he combined with Flute Girl to form a two-headed one-legged monster.
 Julian (voiced by Dee Bradley Baker) - A Gothic Student who is seen wearing a purple top hat, a purple suit, and sports vampiric features such as false fangs. Whenever he is Stankified by the Sorcerer, he is transformed into a spider-like monster.
 Coach Green (voiced by John Oliver) - Randy and Howard's eccentric and insane gym teacher as well as the manager for the Norrisville Wave Slayers water-ski team.
 Morgan (voiced by Kari Wahlgren) - The leader of "Dancing Fish", Morgan is an upperclassman dancer with a sassy attitude and a smug voice. When her entire group (except herself) is stankified by the Sorcerer, they turn into multicolored shark-like creatures. When Stankified by the Sorceress, she is transformed into a green dog-like creature.
 S. Ward Smith (voiced by John Witherspoon in season 1 and Gary Anthony Williams in season 2) - The blind metal shop teacher at Norrisville High School and swordsmith.
 Marlene Driscoll (voiced by Megan Mullally) - Mrs. Driscoll is Randy and Howard's science teacher. She keeps the bones of her dead husband and likes to talk through him like a ventriloquist dummy.
 Pradeep (voiced by Parvesh Cheena) - A student who plays the French horn in the Norrisville High Marching Band. Beeb has a fear of spiders. When he is Stankified by the Sorcerer, he is transformed into a green monster.

Other characters
 Mr. Bannister (voiced by Neil Flynn) - An English teacher at Norrisville High.
 Ms. Wickwhacker (voiced by Grey DeLisle) - The strict and militant band instructor of the Norrisville High Marching Band at Norrisville High.
 Mick (voiced by John DiMaggio) - A football player on Norrisville High School's football team who is Bash Johnson's best friend.
 Juggo (voiced by Dee Bradley Baker) - A student at Norrisville High School who dresses like a clown every day. His known talent is juggling while on a unicycle. When he is Stankified by the Sorcerer, he is transformed into a giant four-armed clown monster with long eyes and sharp teeth.
 Dave (voiced by Carlos Alazraqui) - An accordion player at Norrisville High School. When he is Stankified by the Sorcerer, he is transformed into a thin blue humanoid monster with accordion-like arms.
 Mort Weinerman (voiced by Richard Kind) - The father of Howard Weinerman and Heidi Weinerman. 
 Gene Levine (voiced by John DiMaggio) - An exterminator who helps Viceroy dispose of a few unwanted monster blob creations. He also worked as a Shopkeeper, Builder, and a Home Mover
 Greg - (voiced by Keith Ferguson) - Greg is a worker at the video arcade called "Greg's Game Hole." When Stankified by the Sorcerer, Greg becomes an arcade machine monster. His character is based of Matthew McConaughey in the movie Dazed and Confused. 
 Señora Jorge (voiced by Judy Reyes) - Randy's and Howard's Spanish teacher.
 Dickie (voiced by Bobcat Goldthwait) - In 1985, Dickie was Stankified by the Sorcerer after mistakingly believing that his girlfriend had stood him up.
 Ms. Mary Elizabeth "Tawny" Zingwald (voiced by Annie Potts) - The poetry teacher at Norrisville High School with ankle-length hair.
 Jacques (voiced by Rob Paulsen) - A foreign exchange student from France. He becomes a monkey-like monster after The Ninja humiliates him in front of the school enough for the Sorcerer to Stankify him.
 Buttermaker (voiced by Sterling Knight) - A jock at Norrisville High School who is the captain of the "Wave Slayers" water ski team. When he is Stankified by the Sorcerer, he becomes an olive green aquatic monster with four arms and four legs.
 Brent (voiced by Jason Earles) - A student at Norrisville High School who is the protege of S. Ward Smith. When Stankified by the Sorcerer, he becomes a goblin-like monster in samurai armor.
 Pitch Kickham (voiced by Simon Pegg) - Pitch Kickham is a superstar soccer player who appeared in "The McHugger Games" and "The Three Mascoteers."
 Terry McFist (voiced by Steve Zahn) - Hannibal McFist's hippie big brother and the true heir to McFist Industries.
 Ranginald Bagel (voiced by Gilbert Gottfried) - Ranginald is a student who served as a background character for most of the show.
 First Ninja (voiced by Joel McHale) - The first ninja was the last ninja from the Norisu Nine who became the first Norrisville Ninja and trapped the Sorcerer underground.
 Sinjin Knightfire (voiced by Nat Faxon) - Sinjin Knightfire is a magician and the owner of the Magic Funporium. When Stankified by the Sorcerer, he becomes a magician-themed monster.
 Jason Myers (voiced by Robert Englund) - Also known as Mudfart, Jason Myers was a student at Norrisville High in 1993.
Rudd Rhymez (voiced by David Alan Grier) - A Rapper and Leader of his Posse at Norrisville.
Tiny Timmy Scratch-It (voiced by Biz Markie) - The DJ of the Rapper Rudd Rhymez and A member of his Posse. 
Plop-Plop (voiced by Adam Pally) - The Esquire of The First Ninja and the Guardian of the Sorcerer Ball. 
Levander Hart (voiced by Danny Pudi) - A Norrisville student and was a member of the 30 Seconds to Math. He got stanked after hearing Randy and Howard kicking him out of the group and suddenly became a rock star by himself. 
The Kev (voiced by Pauly Shore) - The Owner of Club Kev a resort in Lake LaRusso. Who appears as a Skinny Man. 
Charlie Cluckers (voiced by Chris Parnell) - The founder, owner, and operator of the Food Chain Charlie Clucker's Chicken.
PJ McFlubbusters Manager (voiced by John O'Hurley) - White-haired, wheel-chaire bound and wears a blue tuxedo. 
Ninja of '05 (voiced by Patrick Warburton) - Muscular guy and Ninja of 2005. 
The Creep (voiced by Bruce Campbell) - Messenger who delivers The Ninjanomicon and Ninja-Mask to whoever is chosen to be the Ninja. He can be seen in every episode.
Dr. Sam (voiced by Bill Hader) - A Pediatrician who takes care Randy.
Rorg (voiced by Rob Riggle) - Protagonist of a TV show, Rorg: A Hero of the Past. Rorg is a parody of both He-Man and Lion-O.
Socko (voiced by Kenan Thompson) -  Rorg's sidekick.
Ruth (voiced by Elaine Stritch) - Mother of Marci McFist. 
Brock Octane (voiced by Kevin Michael Richardson) - Popular action star loosely based on stars like Vin Diesel and Dwayne Johnson.
Mrs. Dempsey (voiced by Grey DeLisle) - Cafeteria Lady at the school.
Sundown (voiced by Fred Tatasciore) - School's Janitor who has an Austrian accent like Arnold Schwarzenegger.
Superintendent (voiced by Ice-T) - Leader of the School Board to Make sure the Student's Education is Right and Follows Rules.
Shopkeeper (voiced by James Hong) - Gift shop clerk in Little Norrisville who has twitching left eye on his. 
Neil Apestrong - Norrisville's astronaut and the first animal to go into space. His name is based on Neil Armstrong. 
Q.T. Bot / Dale (voiced by Rob Riggle) - A Robot from Scrap City who is embarrassed by his name.

Additional voices 

 Andrew Caldwell
 April Stewart
 Ben Schwartz
 Carlos Alazraqui
 Cassie Scerbo
 Dave Wittenberg
 David Koechner
 Dee Bradley Baker
 Fred Tatasciore
 Gary Anthony Williams
 Grey Griffin
 JB Blanc
 Jed Elinoff
 Jeff Bennett
 Jim Rash
 John DiMaggio
 Jon Lovitz
 Kari Wahlgren
 Keith Ferguson
 Kevin Michael Richardson
 Kim Mai Guest
 Mark Slaughter
 Megan Mullally
 Michael Schwartz
 Parvesh Cheena
 Piper Curda
 Sam Riegel
 Sarah Hyland
 Scott Menville
 Scott Thomas
 Tim Curry

Episodes

Broadcast
A preview of Randy Cunningham: 9th Grade Ninja aired on Disney XD August 13, 2012.  The official premiere was on September 17, 2012. Disney XD premiered the series on September 29, 2012 in Canada.  The series premiered on October 4, 2012, on Disney XD in the UK and Ireland. It premiered in Australia on December 10, 2012, on Disney Channel and on April 10, 2014, on Disney XD.

References

External links 

2010s American animated television series
2010s American high school television series
2012 American television series debuts
2015 American television series endings
2010s British animated television series
2012 British television series debuts
2015 British television series endings
2012 Irish television series debuts
2015 Irish television series endings
American children's animated action television series
American children's animated adventure television series
American children's animated comedy television series
American children's animated fantasy television series
American children's animated superhero television series
American flash animated television series
British children's animated action television series
British children's animated adventure television series
British children's animated comedy television series
British children's animated fantasy television series
British children's animated superhero television series
British flash animated television series
British high school television series
Irish children's animated action television series
Irish children's animated adventure television series
Irish children's animated comedy television series
Irish children's animated fantasy television series
Irish children's animated superhero television series
Irish flash animated television series
English-language television shows
Disney XD original programming
Martial arts television series
Ninja fiction
Teen animated television series
Teen superhero television series
Television series by Disney